Salora may refer to:

 Salora Oy, a former consumer electronics manufacturer in Salo, Finland
 Salora International, an Indian conglomerate